= Li Shuirong =

Chinese billionaire businessman

- Born: 1956 (age 69–70)

Li Shuirong (born 1956) is a Chinese billionaire and businessman, serving as the chairman of the Zhejiang Rongsheng Holding Group, which produces petrochemicals.

In 1989, Li Shuirong founded the Yinong Network Chemical Fiber Factory that produced polyester fiber cloth. After the polyester industry shifted upstream, he founded the Zhejiang Rongsheng Holding Group. In 2020, Zhejiang Rongsheng Holding Group became the first private oil refiner that obtained permission from the Chinese government to export refined oil products.

Li Shuirong made the 2022 Forbes Billionaires List with an estimated wealth of $10.3 billion and occupied the 192nd position.
